Colm Ó Clúbhán (1954 – March 1989), also known as Colm Clifford, was an Irish playwright, author, and LGBT rights activist.

Background
Ó Clúbhán was born in Dublin in 1954. His mother was Sheila Marie Eady and his father was the poet and playwright Sigerson Clifford, both from County Cork. Ó Clúbhán is the Irish form of the name Clifford. Ó Clúbhán had four brothers and two sisters. He received his primary schooling at Presentation College in Glasthule, moving to Marian College in Ballsbridge in 1968 where he spent the final four years of his secondary education.

Ó Clúbhán emigrated to London in 1973. He later moved to Barcelona, Spain, for several years to teach English before returning to London in the mid-1980s where he remained until his death.

Career
Ó Clúbhán was a founding member of the London agitprop Brixton Faeries gay theatre group based in Railton Road. His poems and plays focused on queer migrants, identity, and loneliness. He won the 1986 Hennessy Literary Award for Flood. His first play, Friends of Rio Rita took its title from the LGBT slang term Friend of Dorothy and the drag queen Rio Rita in Brendan Behan's play The Hostage who Ó Clúbhán described as “probably the only gay character I know of in Irish drama”. It was first performed at the Oval House Theatre.

Many of his works were not published and have been lost, but some have been rediscovered in the Hall–Carpenter Archives and examined decades after his death. Professor Ed Madden of the University of South Carolina has carried out detailed research on Ó Clúbhán's works and hosted a Boston College Ireland symposium on Ó Clúbhán in 2017.

Plays
 Rip the World Open - 1988
 Reasons for Staying - 1986
 Friends of Rio Rita - 1985

Death
Ó Clúbhán died of HIV/AIDS in March 1989 at the age of 34 or 35. There is a bench within the Walled Garden of Brockwell Park, Brixton, dedicated to his memory.

References

External links
 

1954 births
1989 deaths
Irish LGBT writers
20th-century Irish dramatists and playwrights
20th-century LGBT people
Irish expatriates in England
Writers from Dublin (city)
AIDS-related deaths in Ireland